Colgate University is a private liberal arts college in Hamilton, New York.  The college was founded in 1819 as the Baptist Education Society of the State of New York and operated under that name until 1823, when it was renamed Hamilton Theological and Literary Institution, often called Hamilton College (1823–1846), then Madison College (1846–1890), and its present name since 1890.

Colgate University is among the 100 most selective colleges and universities in the United States, and is considered a Hidden Ivy as well as one of the Little Ivies. In addition, Colgate campus is also consistently ranked as one of the most beautiful campuses in the nation due to a singular architectural theme of the campus and a hillside location adorned with a lake and trees. The university is located in Hamilton, New York, a small town in central New York in Madison County.
Colgate now enrolls nearly 3,000 students in 56 undergraduate majors that culminate in a Bachelor of Arts degree. The student body is 54% female and 46% male students who participate in over 200 clubs and organizations. While Colgate offers almost an entirely undergraduate program, it also has a small graduate program in Master of Arts in Teaching.

Colgate competes in NCAA Division I sports and is part of the Patriot League athletic conference.

History 

According to Colgate archivist Howard Williams in his History of Colgate University 1819–1969, "the story of Colgate’s early years is often confusing because of the variety of names used in referring to it."

In 1817, the Baptist Education Society of the State of New York was founded by thirteen men (six clergymen and seven laymen). Two years later, in 1819, the state granted the school's charter, and the school opened a year later, in 1820. The first classes were held in a building in the townvillage? of Hamilton. Three years later, in 1823, the Baptist Theological Seminary at New York City incorporated with the Baptist Education Society and subsequently changed its name to the Hamilton Literary & Theological Institution. Among the trustees was William Colgate, founder of the Colgate Company.

In 1826, the school's trustees bought farmland that later became the focal point of the campus, known as 'The Hill'. One year later, the current students and faculty of the school built West Hall, by using stone taken from a quarry found on the land. Originally called West Edifice before being renamed to West Hall, it is the oldest structure on campus. On March 26, 1846, the State of New York granted a college charter to Hamilton's Collegiate Department; in the two years prior to that, at the request of Hamilton trustees, degrees of forty-five Bachelor's students and at least one Master's candidate were awarded by Columbian College in Washington, D.C. (now the George Washington University), a fellow Baptist institution. In 1846, the school changed its name to Madison University. In 1850, the Baptist Education Society planned to move the university to Rochester, but was halted by legal action. Dissenting trustees, faculty, and students founded the University of Rochester. Another group of Baptist dissenters, calling for an end to racial and gender discrimination, had founded New-York Central College in 1849.
In 1890, Madison University changed its name to Colgate University in recognition of the family and its gifts to the school. James B. Colgate, one of William Colgate's sons, established a $1 million endowment called the Dodge Memorial Fund. In 1912 Colgate Academy, a preparatory school and high school that had operated in Hamilton since the early 1800s, was closed and its facility became Colgate University's administration building. The theological side of Colgate merged with the Rochester Theological Seminary in 1928 to become the Colgate Rochester Divinity School, leaving Colgate to become non-denominational.

During World War II, Colgate University was one of 131 colleges and universities nationally that took part in the V-12 Navy College Training Program which offered students a path to a Navy commission.

Beginning with undergraduate students admitted in 2022, Colgate plans to be fully tuition-free for students from families making $80,000 or less, cost between 5 and 10% of income for families making between $80,000 to $150,000, and meet 100% of demonstrated need for students from families making more than $150,000.

Coeducation 
From its inception, the institution was an all-male institution but started to see female students attend in a limited capacity as early as the mid-1800s when Emily Taylor, daughter of then-president Stephen W. Taylor (1851–56), attended her father's moral philosophy class.

The institution's first full-time female student was Mabel Dart (later Colegrove), who participated in classes from 1878 to 1882. At the time, university officials deemed it best that a female student not be embarrassed by graduating from an all-male college, and made arrangements for Dart to officially receive her degree from then all-female Vassar College.

In the ensuing years, additional female students participated in courses, including faculty spouses and the wives of enrolled veterans in the post-WWII era. Colgate became fully coeducational in 1970.

President Cutten's controversial legacies 
The national monument at Ellis Island displays a statement by Colgate's eighth President, George Barton Cutten, which has been criticized for its jingoistic anti-immigration sentiment. He warned, "The danger [that] the 'melting pot' brings to the nation is the breeding out of the higher divisions of the white race."

While Cutten's legacy has been marred by the espousal of racist beliefs, the contributions he made to developing the prestige and facilities of Colgate were significant. Student protests in 2006 around campus facilities bearing Cutten's name became emblematic of the division surrounding how modern American universities should broker their own history with racism, foreshadowing future controversies in the mid-2010s at universities such as Yale University and Harvard University. Colgate removed the Cutten name from a residential complex located between Whitnall Field and Huntington Gym in 2017. Each of the four houses that compose the building—Brigham, Shepardson, Read, and Whitnall—is now known by its existing name and street address, 113 Broad Street.

Campus 

Colgate University is located in the rural village of Hamilton Village, Hamilton, New York. The university owns an additional  of undeveloped forested lands.

Colgate's first building, West Hall, was built by students and faculty from stones from Colgate's own rock quarry. Nearly all the buildings on campus are built of stone, and newer buildings are built with materials that fit the style. Old Biology Hall was built in 1884 and added to the National Register of Historic Places in 1973. The principal campus plan was created by Ernest W. Bowditch in 1891–1893, drawing on earlier recommendations by Frederick Law Olmsted.

Probably the most distinctive building on campus is Colgate Memorial Chapel, which was built in 1918 and is used for lectures, performances, concerts, and religious services.

Most of the campus's heat is generated from a wood boiler which burns wood chips, a renewable resource. Almost all of Colgate's electricity comes from a hydroelectric dam at Niagara Falls; the rest comes from nuclear sources. The campus also has a Green Bikes program with over two dozen bikes that are loaned out in an effort to encourage students to rely less on cars. Colgate Dining Services currently provides organic rice, beans, and other dry foods, and is working to offer more local foods options. Dining Services take-out containers are also made from natural materials, and are compostable. "On August 13, Colgate received a perfect sustainability score from the Princeton Review. As a result, it was recognized as one of only 24 schools (out of 861 evaluated) to make their Green Honor Roll.

Outreach 
Colgate founded the Upstate Institute in 2003. The institute was created to connect the Colgate community to its surrounding region, as well as to give back and help economically and socially sustain the area. Currently, they do research on counties in the area, as well as support outreach and volunteer organizations.

Colgate was an initial sponsor of Partnership for Community Development, a local nonprofit organization which seeks to support the community through the revitalization of buildings and small business development.

Longyear Museum of Anthropology
The Longyear Museum of Anthropology is part of the Department of Sociology and Anthropology at Colgate University. Carol Ann Lorenz is the Senior Curator and Jordan Kerber is the Curator of Archaeological Collections.

The Longyear Museum exhibition gallery is centrally located in Alumni Hall on campus. The museum has approximately 20,000 archaeological artifacts from North, Central, and South America as well as artworks from Africa, Native North America, Asia, and Oceania. Prior to the construction of the gallery, objects were exhibited in display cases in the department of Social Relations.

Professor of anthropology and archaeologist John M. Longyear III, who retired from Colgate University in 1978, suggested a Museum where students could study and interact with the collection.

Today, the Museum hosts about four exhibitions per academic year, some of which are partly curated by students. Academic classes also work in conjunction with the Longyear. As a group, students in these classes research and curate exhibitions from the Museum's collection, or create virtual exhibitions. During the summer months, students can apply for research grants to work directly with the permanent collection. In some cases, student work will result in an exhibition featuring the researched objects. Access to the collection is available to students who enroll in an independent study class and receive course credit for working with the museum.

Picker Art Gallery

The Picker Art Gallery is a fine arts museum that is housed in the Dana Arts Center at Colgate University in Hamilton, New York. It was named after Evelyn Picker, class of '36 and trustee emeritus, and opened in 1969. The Museum houses an impressive 11,000-some art objects in its permanent collections. Highlights include old master paintings from Europe, woodblock prints from China and Japan, and a series of original photographs from famed Soviet wartime photographer Yevgeny Khaldei. The Picker has also hosted exhibitions from artists across the world and collections from other museums in the US.

Since 2013, there have been plans to move the Picker collection to a new facility, which Colgate University has named the Center for Art and Culture. This center, which was designed and centered with the community at large in mind, includes plans for “exhibition space, seminar rooms, project space, and archive space,” along with office space, reception area, amenities, and a space for public functions. The same building plans to house the Longyear Museum of Anthropology.

Exhibitions
In 2013, the Picker Art Museum launched an online campaign to display works as a digital exhibition, their first being "Selected Old Masters From the Picker Art Gallery". Other than this online gallery, all exhibition, and educational programs have been temporarily ceased due to the university's thorough assessment of the works in anticipation for the move to the new Center for Arts and Culture.

Academic journal
Colgate University edits and publishes an international academic journal entitled Medieval & Renaissance Drama in England. It was founded in 1984 and publishes academic content related to the study of drama prior to 1642. It is part of the English Department. This journal is also indexed and available on JSTOR.

Academics 

Colgate offers 56 undergraduate majors leading to a Bachelor of Arts degree, all of which are registered officially with the New York State Department of Education. The university also has a small Master of Arts in Teaching degree program, which graduates 3–7 students each year. Its most popular undergraduate majors, by 2021 graduates, were:
Econometrics and Quantitative Economics (76)
Political Science and Government (65)
English Language and Literature (44)
Research and Experimental Psychology (43)
Biology/Biological Sciences (41)
Computer Science (35)

In addition to regular campus courses, the university offers 22 semester-long off-campus study groups each year, including programs in Australia, China, Japan, India, several Western European countries, Washington, D.C., and the National Institutes of Health. Approximately two-thirds of Colgate undergraduates study abroad, which is a high proportion compared to other colleges and universities in the United States. About 95% of seniors graduate and most alumni proceed to graduate schools in law, administration, engineering, medicine, the arts, and the sciences, as well as to financial, administrative or scientific occupations. In partnership similar to that of Haverford and Swarthmore, Colgate students are also able to enroll in classes at Hamilton College, another nearby selective liberal arts school.

Admissions 
For the class of 2026 (entering fall 2022), 21,261 students applied, 2,264 (12%) were admitted, and 841 matriculated. Enrolled students had an average high school GPA of 3.95 out of 4.0, with 72% of students in the top 10% of their class and 91% in top 20%. The middle 50% SAT range was 1460 to 1540, while the ACT composite range was 32 to 35. The university met 100% of the demonstrated need with financial aid. For the admitted students with a total family income of under $125,000, Colgate offers financial aid package that involves no loan.

Rankings 

In its 2020 edition, U.S. News & World Report ranked Colgate tied as the 17th-best liberal arts college in the country, 17th "Best Value School", and tied for 35th "Best Undergraduate Teaching". The university's campus was ranked as the most beautiful by The Princeton Review in their 2010 edition. In July 2008, Colgate was named fifth on Forbes' list of Top Colleges for Getting Rich, the only non-Ivy League college in the top 5. Colgate is listed as one of America's 25 "New Ivies" by Newsweek magazine. It is also on the list of "100 best campuses for LGBT students."  Colgate has been ranked third by The Journal of Blacks in Higher Education for its success in integrating African-American students.

In 2014, Colgate was ranked the top college in the United States by Payscale and CollegeNet's Social Mobility Index college rankings. It is also listed as one of 30 Hidden Ivies and as one of Newsweek "New Ivies". In 2014, Princeton Review ranked Colgate as the Most Beautiful Campus in America.

Administration
On July 1, 2016 Brian Casey began serving as Colgate's 17th president.

Board of Trustees 
Colgate is governed by a board of trustees composed of 35 members: 31 alumni, three parents of students, and the current president. As of December 31, 2022, Colgate's endowment was $1.19 billion.

Student life

Housing and student life facilities 

Colgate has ten residence halls located on its central campus, which is often referred to as "up the hill." Located near the academic buildings, freshmen live in six of these halls, whereas sophomores live in the other three, or in townhouses or one house on Broad Street. Juniors and seniors live down the hill in a number of residences, such as theme houses on Broad Street, apartment complexes or in "townhouses" located further away from campus. Themed houses are available for students who want to explore their interests. The Creative Arts house is geared toward creative students; Asia House is for students with interests in Asian culture. Although the university provides housing for students all four years, students can apply for off-campus housing, of which only 250 are granted the privilege through a lottery. Students involved in Greek life have the option of living in their organization's house, though they cannot do so until their junior year.

Colgate has three dining facilities on campus that are run by Colgate Dining Services, which in turn is run by Chartwells. There is also a cafe located in Case Library that serves coffee.

The O'Connor Campus Center, commonly referred to as the Coop, serves as the center for student life and programming. Renovations on it were completed in 2004, and it now houses the offices for student organizations, a cafeteria, post office, printing center, a computer facility, as well as the new Blackmore Media Center, home to WRCU, Colgate's radio station.

Fraternities and sororities 
Since the first chartered chapter in 1856, fraternities and sororities have been part of a long-standing tradition at Colgate University.

About forty-five percent of sophomores, juniors, and seniors belong to fraternities or sororities at Colgate. Students are not allowed to pledge until the fall semester of their sophomore year. , there are five fraternities (Beta Theta Pi, Delta Upsilon, Theta Chi, Phi Delta Theta, and Phi Kappa Tau) and three sororities (Gamma Phi Beta, Delta Delta Delta, and Kappa Kappa Gamma) that are active on campus.

Following a number of incidents related to fraternities and sororities on campus, in 2005, the university decided to purchase the Greek houses. All but one of them agreed to sell their houses. The hold-out, Delta Kappa Epsilon, was subsequently derecognized. Students were forbidden from living in the house (which is now school-owned housing) or participating in the fraternity's activities. Delta Kappa Epsilon no longer has an affiliation with the school.

Student groups 
Colgate has close to 200 student groups and organizations. The groups cover a wide array of interests, including academic organizations, personal interests, student government, honor societies, and cultural and religious organizations. Among its more notable groups are the a cappella groups The Colgate Thirteen and The Swinging 'Gates, the Jewish philanthropic and social group the Blue Diamond Society, the improv group Charred Goosebeak (which was founded by the members of Broken Lizard) and an open collegiate level Club Figure Skating team.

Media 
WRCU is Colgate University's student-operated radio station, broadcasting throughout central New York on 90.1 FM, and the station was re-modeled in 2010. Colgate's student-run TV station, CUTV, broadcasts on the university's local cable system and provides a mix of student-created content and first-run movies 24 hours a day. The Colgate Maroon-News, is the oldest college weekly in America. The first student newspaper was the Hamilton Student, launched on November 2, 1846. The Monthly Rag, the college's satirical newspaper, was founded in 2007. Its slogan is, "written by 13 writers with 13 stories after 13 beers". The Colgate Scene is a quarterly alumni publication.

Traditions 

The number 13 is considered to be lucky at Colgate. It is said that Colgate was founded by thirteen men with thirteen dollars, thirteen prayers and thirteen articles. This tradition is expressed in many ways. Colgate's address is 13 Oak Drive, and its zip code is 13346, which begins with 13 and ends with three digits that sum to 13. The Tredecim Senior Honor Society (formerly Konosioni) is composed of 13 men and 13 women. Alumni wear Colgate apparel on every Friday the 13th, which is designated as Colgate Day.

In 1936, the Colgate swim team made its first trip to Fort Lauderdale, Florida for spring break training at the Casino Pool. This became a regular tradition for Colgate that caught on with other schools across the country and proved to be the genesis of the college spring break trip.

Athletics 

Approximately 25% of students are involved in a varsity sport, and 80% of students are involved in some form of varsity, club, or intramural athletics. There are 25 varsity teams, over 30 club sports teams, and 18 different intramural sports. Colgate is part of NCAA Division I for all varsity sports.

The football program competes within the Division I Football Championship Subdivision (FCS). The athletic teams are nicknamed the "Raiders," and the traditional team colors are maroon and white, with a more recent addition of gray in the 1970s. Maroon replaced orange as the school's primary color on March 24, 1900. Colgate is a member of the Patriot League for all varsity sports except for hockey, in which both its men's and women's teams are members of ECAC Hockey.

Starting in 1932, Colgate athletics teams were called the "Red Raiders" in reference to the new maroon uniforms of that season's "undefeated, untied, unscored upon, and uninvited" football team, which was the first to use the moniker. Apocryphal explanations for the name include the team's ability to defeat its much larger rival, the Cornell University Big Red, or that a rainstorm caused one Colgate football team's maroon jerseys to blend into a reddish color. Regardless, after the adoption of a Native American mascot, the school debated changing the name and mascot in the 1970s out of sensitivity to Native Americans. At that time the nickname was retained, but the mascot was changed to a hand holding a torch. In 2001, the administration acknowledged concerns that the adjective "Red" still had a Native American implication, and the school shortened the nickname to the "Raiders" starting in the 2001–02 school year. A new mascot was introduced in 2006.

Colgate University's football team was selected to share the 1932 national championship by Parke H. Davis in 1933 and appeared in the Associated Press top-level polls in 1942 and 1977.  The 1932 team was "unbeaten, untied, unscored upon, and uninvited", as it registered shutouts against all nine opponents, but was not invited to the 1933 Rose Bowl. Colgate began playing in NCAA Division I-AA, now known as Division I FCS, in 1982 and made the Division I-AA (now FCS) football playoffs in 1982, 1983, 1997, 1998, 1999, 2003, 2005, 2008, 2012, 2015 and, most recently, 2018.

In the 2003 season, the Raiders made it to the NCAA I-AA championship game in football for the first time, where they lost to the University of Delaware. At the end of the season, their record was 15–1. At the time, they had the longest winning streak in all of Division I football, including one win over a Division I-A (now Division I FBS) team, Buffalo.

Cornell is a common rival in all sports; hockey games against Cornell are major events on campus, with students lining up for hours before the game in order to secure tickets. Colgate's teams (with the exception of football, golf, and men's hockey) also compete annually against Syracuse University. Cornell and Syracuse are both within two hours of Colgate's campus. Colgate and Syracuse were once bitter rivals in football (there are some old traditions related to their games), but a variety of factors, including the splitting of Division I football into Division I FBS and Division I FCS in the late 1970s, helped end the annual game, with some exceptions (such as 2010) over the years. Their men's lacrosse rivalry remains fierce.

Outdoor education 
Colgate makes use of its rural location by having a full outdoor education program. A base camp is located on campus and allows students to rent equipment for skiing, camping, and other outdoor events. Each year, twelve to fifteen students are selected to become staffers for Outdoor Education. The training takes more than six months and includes a Wilderness First Responder certification. Incoming first-year students are offered a week-long trip called Wilderness Adventure, where they spend a week backpacking, canoeing, kayaking, tree climbing, caving or rock climbing in the Adirondacks.

Alumni 

Colgate has more than 34,000 living alumni. , Colgate alumni have a median starting salary of $53,700 and have a median mid-career salary of $119,000. Forbes ranks Colgate 16th in colleges that produce the highest-earning graduates. Among small schools, Colgate is the tenth-largest producer of alumni who go onto the Peace Corps.

Some of the most notable alumni from the List of Colgate University people include:

References

External links 
 
 Colgate University Athletics website

 
Private universities and colleges in New York (state)
Universities and colleges in Madison County, New York
Liberal arts colleges in New York (state)
1819 establishments in New York (state)
Educational institutions established in 1819